Point Chevalier (commonly known as Point Chev and an original colonial name of Point Bunbury after Thomas Bunbury) is  a residential suburb and peninsula in the city of Auckland in the north of New Zealand. It is located five kilometres to the west of the city centre on the southern shore of the Waitematā Harbour. The suburb was originally a working-class area, with some state houses in the area, but over the past several decades the suburb has seen growth into becoming a middle-class suburb, with several redevelopment projects either completed or underway. Like most of the suburbs surrounding, Point Chevalier is known for its Californian style bungalows.

The suburb stretches from the town centre / shopping area of the same name on its southern edge (Great North Road, and near the SH16 motorway) to the tip of the peninsula in the north. Its postcode is 1022.

Geography

The suburb is situated to the north of State Highway 16 and the campus of Unitec Institute of Technology and to the west of the suburb of Western Springs. It is largely sited on the triangular peninsula, which extends north into the harbour for 1800 metres. The soil is mostly clay without the overlay of volcanic material which covers much of the Auckland isthmus; this means the vegetation of the area is less lush than some of the other suburbs of Auckland.

Visible from Coyle Park is Meola Reef, which is situated to the east of the Point Chevalier peninsula and bordering the suburb of Westmere. Meola Reef is an outcrop of black basalt rock which extends some distance north into the Waitematā Harbour. This is the end of the lava flow emanating from Three Kings volcano several miles south of this area. Formerly a landfill site, it has now been rehabilitated as a park and nature reserve. Other parks in the suburb include Walker Park, Eric Armshaw Reserve and Coyle Park. The latter is located at the northern tip of the peninsula.

History

Early history and European settlement

Before the European settlement of the Auckland isthmus in the 1840s, small Maori settlements existed in the area which later became Point Chevalier, including one at Meola Reef and a fishing settlement at Rangi-mata-rau (later Point Chevalier Beach). The latter was a staging point for shark fishing off Kauri Point on the inner Waitematā Harbour.

As the city of Auckland grew, Point Chevalier gained strategic importance as it lay on what was then the main land route out of Auckland, the Great North Road. Because of this, a military encampment was located here during the New Zealand Wars of the 1860s. The name 'Point Chevalier' comes from Captain George Robert Chevalier (1825 - 1871), a musketry instructor serving in the 65th Regiment, stationed at this camp.

The Point Chevalier area had a largely rural character up until the period between the two World Wars.

As summer destination

Coyle Park and Point Chevalier Beach were popular destinations for family outings during the interwar period, particularly in summer. Tramlines ran down Point Chevalier Road to Coyle Park, near the beach; during summer, special trams were laid on during summer to transport people from Grey Lynn, while buses brought others from Mount Albert and West Auckland suburbs. Following the Second World War, the combination of increased car ownership and the Auckland Harbour Bridge (1959) resulted in a complete reversal of this activity. The once crowded beach was deserted, and the various businesses that had prospered on the summer trade closed down or relocated. Whilst the tramlines were removed during the 1950s, the broadness of Point Chevalier Road - otherwise atypical for a fairly small suburb - and the paved-over roundabout terminus near Coyle Park both remain as evidence of their presence.

Due to sand loss and degradation over the 20th century, Point Chevalier Beach was resanded in 2008 with 16,000 cubic metres of sand from Pakiri Beach pumped onto the foreshore, creating a more usable beach area. The resanding has attracted larger numbers of summer visitors in the years since, making the northern part of Point Chevalier busy (and sometimes congested with vehicles) on fine weekends and holidays and at festival times.

Demographic changes

Up until the 1980s Point Chevalier's population was largely blue-collar or elderly, the latter particularly due to the Selwyn Village retirement community (one of the largest in New Zealand). Over the 1980s and 1990s the suburb became home to increasing numbers of young families and middle-class professionals. However, 2013 census data suggested that Point Chevalier experienced a strong decrease in its young adult population (ages 20–34) after 2001; analysts have ascribed this to the increasing cost of housing in the central-western suburbs of Auckland.

Demographics

Point Chevalier had a population of 8,460 at the 2018 New Zealand census, an increase of 291 people (3.6%) since the 2013 census, and an increase of 828 people (10.8%) since the 2006 census. There were 3,033 households, comprising 3,948 males and 4,509 females, giving a sex ratio of 0.88 males per female, with 1,734 people (20.5%) aged under 15 years, 1,389 (16.4%) aged 15 to 29, 4,014 (47.4%) aged 30 to 64, and 1,323 (15.6%) aged 65 or older.

Ethnicities were 82.0% European/Pākehā, 8.9% Māori, 8.5% Pacific peoples, 10.5% Asian, and 3.3% other ethnicities. People may identify with more than one ethnicity.

The percentage of people born overseas was 23.9, compared with 27.1% nationally.

Although some people chose not to answer the census's question about religious affiliation, 54.3% had no religion, 33.7% were Christian, 0.4% had Māori religious beliefs, 1.5% were Hindu, 1.3% were Muslim, 1.1% were Buddhist and 2.3% had other religions.

Of those at least 15 years old, 2,643 (39.3%) people had a bachelor's or higher degree, and 714 (10.6%) people had no formal qualifications. 2,097 people (31.2%) earned over $70,000 compared to 17.2% nationally. The employment status of those at least 15 was that 3,462 (51.5%) people were employed full-time, 1,014 (15.1%) were part-time, and 189 (2.8%) were unemployed.

Architecture and landmarks

The Liverpool Estate is a piece of land bordered at one end by Great North and Point Chevalier Roads. Besides housing, it now contains a supermarket, assorted shops and the Point Chevalier Community Library. The estate was created in 1913 by a group known as the Liverpool Estate Syndicate and was marketed as a "last opportunity" to acquire main road frontage close to the city. It was only a fifteen-minute walk to the Arch Hill terminus and a significant selling point was that a motorbus passed by. The Point Chevalier Motor Bus Company ran from 1915-1920 and was owned by prominent locals, including a member of the Dignan family. Following the First World War with the rising price of oil, it went into voluntary liquidation. Estate land was also connected to sewerage and drainage, gas and water were available on the boundary and a school was nearby. Another factor was that it was not far from the "beautiful Point Chevalier beach."

Several of the streets in the Liverpool Estate were named after New Zealand birds – Moa, Huia and Kiwi Roads and Tui Street - and according to the book Rangi-Mata-Rau: Pt Chevalier Centennial 1861-1961, it was a bird-loving (although unnamed) member of the Dignan family who got the honour of naming them.

The houses of the area are predominantly 1920s California-style bungalows and 1930s and 1940s Art Deco houses, which gives the suburb an interesting interwar atmosphere. Rising property values have spurred gentrification and subdivision in recent years, particularly north of Meola Road and in locations near to the water. Towards the northern end of the peninsula there are many houses from the postwar period, and a number of larger architect-designed homes have recently appeared close to Point Chevalier Beach.

There is a certain amount of light industry located in the area, especially close to Great North Road. Up until the mid-2000s car yards were a common land use along this road.

There is a retirement community, Selwyn Village, on the western side, overlooking the Waitematā Harbour. This community is run by an Anglican church trust and includes self-contained houses and apartments, bed-sits, a hospital, and a chapel.

The main shopping area at the intersection of Point Chevalier Road and Great North Road was developed during the interwar period; the most notable of the buildings here are:

 The former cinema (1920s designed by Sinclair O'Connor) later known as the 'Ambassador' theatre, and currently the Ambassador Bar. The bar is owned by sculptor Peter Roche, who works on his artworks in the building.
ASB Bank: Great North Road. This small neo-classical building is one of the many buildings commissioned by the Auckland Savings Bank from the architect Daniel B. Patterson. Similar buildings appear in Auckland suburban centres and in provincial towns throughout the Auckland Province. As of late 2016, the branch is now closed
The current Point Chevalier Public Library located at the junction of Point Chevalier Road and Great North Road was opened in 1989.
The former Point Chevalier Fire Station located on the corner of Point Chevalier Road and Tui Street. This 1920s classical style building is now occupied by a hostel.
The former Whau Lunatic Asylum. To the south of Great North Road, across State Highway 16, lies the former psychiatric hospital. This imposing brick Italianate/Romanesque structure was the largest building in the colony when it was built. Construction began in 1865, supervised by James Wrigley using plans from Great Britain. Dr Pollen's brickworks supplied the bricks. Following a fire in 1877, the reconstruction and extension of the hospital was supervised by Philip Herepath. Notorious as the "Oakley Mental Hospital" and "Carrington Hospital", it was decommissioned during the early 1990s. The buildings are now used as a school, part of the campus of Unitec Institute of Technology.
"The Old Homestead", a 19th-century wooden farmhouse, was located until 2013 at the corner of Alberta Street and Point Chevalier Road. It was removed for storage and renovation at Kumeu by its owners, the Homestead Community Church. The church has built a new replica building on the same site.

Sport and recreation

Tennis
The local tennis club Point Chevalier Tennis Club https://clubspark.kiwi/ptchevtennis supports social and inter-club tennis. The club  welcomes casual players and new members. Juniors, seniors, families etc, with coaching and regular events.

Association football
Point Chevalier is home to Western Springs AFC who compete in the NRFL Premier Division

Rugby league
Walker Park is the home ground of the Point Chevalier Pirates club.

Sailing
Home to Point Chevalier Sailing Club Inc (established in 1919) is one of the oldest sailing dinghy clubs in NZL and still very active with junior sailing programmes as well as racing.

Croquet and Bowls

The Hallyburton Johnstone Sports Complex in Dignan Street is home to the Point Chevalier Croquet and Bowling clubs.

Education
The main primary school in the suburb is Pt Chevalier Primary School, situated on Te Ra Road with a roll of   students. Both schools cater for year 1-6 students.

All these schools are coeducational. Rolls are as of 

Pt Chevalier is served by a large co-ed State secondary school, Western Springs College located in the nearby suburb of Western Springs. Many students also attend Auckland Girls' Grammar School or Mount Albert Grammar School (co-ed). Nearby Catholic state-integrated schools are St Paul's College (boys) or Saint Mary's College (girls).

References

 Pictures from the Past, Auckland & Northland, Terence Hodgson & A.M.Ringer. Whitcoulls, 2002.

External links 
The Point Chevalier Hub (a private, nonprofit website about Point Chevalier)
Photographs of Point Chevalier held in Auckland Libraries' heritage collections.

Suburbs of Auckland
Peninsulas of the Auckland Region
Populated places around the Waitematā Harbour